is a Japanese professional shogi player ranked 7-dan.

Early life
Sanmaidō was born in Urayasu, Chiba on July 14, 1993. His grandfather was an acquaintance of shogi professional Kunio Naitō, who recommended Sanmaidō learn shogi. Sanmaidō often went to practice at the Kashiwa Shogi Center to improve, and entered the Japan Shogi Association's apprentice school at the rank of 6-kyū under the guidance of Naitō in September 2004. Promoted to the rank of 3-dan in April 2013, Sanmaidō finished second in the 53rd 3-dan League with a record of 14 wins and 4 losses to obtain full professional status and the rank of 4-dan in October 2013.

Promotion history
Sanmaidō's promotion history is as follows:

 2004, September: 6-kyū
 2013, April: 3-dan
 2013, October 1: 4-dan
 2017, July 27: 5-dan
 2017, November 24: 6-dan
 2019, September 4: 7-dan

Titles and other championships
Sanmaidō has yet to appear in a major title match, but has won one non-title shogi tournament. He won the 2nd  in 2017.

References

External links
ShogiHub: Professional Player Info · Sanmaido, Tatsuya
 

Japanese shogi players
Living people
Professional shogi players
Professional shogi players from Chiba Prefecture
1993 births
People from Urayasu, Chiba